"Kelly Price" is a song by American hip hop group Migos, released on January 27, 2017 from their second studio album Culture (2017). Featuring American rapper Travis Scott, the song was produced by Cash Clay Beats and Deraj Global.

Composition
In the song, Quavo, Takeoff and Travis Scott sing about riding in luxury cars and their lifestyle of spending time with women and taking drugs. XXL described the instrumental as "elegant, slow-moving".

Critical reception
In an otherwise positive review of Culture, Winston Cook-Wilson of Spin wrote, "The album only seems to tire of being serviceable and precise in its final act, slumping into the oddly bloated, Travis-Scott-assisted ballad 'Kelly Price'".

Charts

References

2017 songs
Migos songs
Travis Scott songs
Songs written by Quavo
Songs written by Offset (rapper)
Songs written by Takeoff (rapper)
Songs written by Travis Scott